Marg Sar (also Romanized as Margeh Sar, Margsar, and Marg-e Sar; also known as Qal‘eh-ye Margsar) is a village in Mahru Rural District, Zaz va Mahru District, Aligudarz County, Lorestan Province, Iran. At the 2006 census, its population was 398, in 70 families, making it the most populous village in the rural district.

References 

Towns and villages in Aligudarz County